Jan Kielas (9 July 1916 – 28 April 1997) was a Polish middle-distance runner. He competed in the men's 3000 metres steeplechase at the 1952 Summer Olympics.

References

1916 births
1997 deaths
Athletes (track and field) at the 1952 Summer Olympics
Polish male middle-distance runners
Polish male steeplechase runners
Olympic athletes of Poland
Lechia Gdańsk athletes
Sportspeople from Gdańsk